P31 may refer to:

Aircraft 
 Boulton Paul P.31 Bittern, a British prototype fighter aircraft
 Curtiss XP-31 Swift, an American experimental fighter aircraft
 Percival P.31 Proctor, a British radio trainer and communications aircraft

Vessels 
 , a corvette of the Argentine Navy
 , a submarine of the Royal Navy
 , a corvette of the Indian Navy
 , a ship of the Irish Naval Service
 , of the Armed Forces of Malta

Other uses 
 Makhuwa language
 Papyrus 31, a biblical manuscript
 Phosphorus-31 (P-31 or 31P), a stable isotope of phosphorus
 Pioneer P-31, a failed lunar probe
 P31, a state regional road in Latvia